Odostomia conspicua is a species of sea snail, a marine gastropod mollusc in the family Pyramidellidae, the pyrams and their allies.

Description
The shell grows to a length of 8.7 mm.
The solid shell is opaque and glossy, with microscopic spiral and longitudinal striae. The shell has a pale cream color, varying to chocolate, and
more or less stained with madder. There are eight whorls (besides 2 embryonic). The periphery is obtusely angulated, the angle showing at the base of the spire whorls. The umbilicus is extremely small, almost covered. The columellar tooth is strong and conspicuous. The outer lip is grooved within.

Distribution
This species occurs in the following locations:
 European waters (ERMS scope)
 Mediterranean Sea: Greek Exclusive Economic Zone
 Irish Exclusive economic Zone
 Portuguese Exclusive Economic Zone
 Spanish Exclusive Economic Zone
 United Kingdom Exclusive Economic Zone

References

External links
 
 To Biodiversity Heritage Library (40 publications)
 To CLEMAM
 To Encyclopedia of Life
 To Marine Species Identification Portal
 To World Register of Marine Species

conspicua
Gastropods described in 1850